Francesco Pigoni (born 29 March 1986) is an Italian footballer who last played for KF Tirana.

References

1986 births
Living people
Italian footballers
KF Tirana players
Kategoria Superiore players
Expatriate footballers in Albania
Italian expatriates in Albania
Association football defenders
P.D. Castellarano players